Holbrookia maculata perspicua, commonly known as the eastern earless lizard and the prairie earless lizard, is a subspecies of lizard in the family Phrynosomatidae. H. m. perspicua is a subspecies of the lesser earless lizard (Holbrookia maculata). The subspecies is native to the prairies of the central United States.

Geographic range
H. m. perspicua is found in Oklahoma, and northern Texas.

Description
The prairie earless lizard is an overall gray-brown in color, a row of dark blotches on either side of the back, and a light-colored stripe down the middle of the back. The male has black and white diagonal markings just before its hind legs. Typically, females lack these markings. As its geographic range overlaps with other subspecies of H. maculata, distinguishing it can be difficult.

Behavior
Like all earless lizards, the prairie earless lizard is diurnal and insectivorous. It often seen basking on rocks, but will flee quickly if approached.

Reproduction
H. m. perspicua is oviparous.

References

Further reading
Axtell RW (1956). "A Solution to the Long Neglected Holbrookia lacerata Problem, and the Description of Two New Subspecies of Holbrookia". Bulletin of the Chicago Academy of Sciences 10 (11): 163–179 + Plates I–II. (Holbrookia maculata perspicua, new subspecies, pp. 167–169 + Plate I, figures 1–2).
Powell R, Conant R, Collins JT (2016). Peterson Field Guide to Reptiles and Amphibians of Eastern and Central North America, Fourth Edition. The Peterson Field Guide Series. Boston and New York: Houghton Mifflin Harcourt. xiv + 494 pp., 47 color plates, 207 figures. (Holbrookia maculata perspicua, p. 289).

External links
Herps of Texas: Holbrookia maculata

Holbrookia
Fauna of the Plains-Midwest (United States)